Ajeyudu is a 1987 Indian Telugu-language film, directed by G. Ram Mohan Rao and produced by S. Venkataratnam. It stars Venkatesh and Shobana, with music composed by Chakravarthy. The film was  Average at the box office.

Plot
Murali a student, has completed his MA LLB and he is love with a girl, Rekha. Murali has a happy family, his father Dhanunjaya Rao is a multimillionaire and mother Tulasi is good-hearted. Rekha is a daughter of Justice Jaganatham; everyone agrees for their marriage. One time, Murali saves a girl Padma from a few rowdies and meets her blind mother Parvathi, after few days he discovers that they are his mother and sister.

Actually, 20 years back, his father Sivaram is a taxi driver, once a few gangsters hire his taxi and rob Jaganatham's house when he was a lawyer and kills his wife, for that, Jaganatham sends him to jail and in an accident Parvathi loses her eyesight, Murali is separated from them and adopted by Dhanunjaya Rao and wife. Meanwhile, Murali brings his mother and sister to their house, on the engagement of Murali and Rekha, Jagannatham recognizes Parvathi and cancels the match, Murali challenges Jaganatham that he will prove that his father Sivaram is innocent.

Murali learns that his father Sivaram escaped from jail, became a dacoit and lurks in a forest. He meets him and has him surrender to Police, takes up his case as defence counsel and he is in search of the original criminals. During the process, a shocking incident; the real culprit is none other than his adopted father Dhanunjaya Rao. Now Murali is in the stage of dichotomy whom to sacrifice, he says everything to his adopted mother Tulasi, she inspires Murali to protect justice by punishing her husband. Meanwhile, Dhanunjaya Rao kidnaps Parvarthi and Padma, Murali saves them, sees the end of Dhanunjaya Rao and protects justice.

Cast

Venkatesh as Murali
Shobana as Rekha
Satyanarayana as Dhanunjaya Rao
Sarada as Tulasi
Jaggaiyah as Siva Ram
Gummadi as Justice Jaganatham 
Subhalekha Sudhakar as Vishnu Chakram
Suthi Veerabhadra Rao as Bhadram
Suthivelu as Mukundam
Chitti Babu 
Narra Venkateswara Rao
Raja as Inspector Ramu
Saradhi
Annapurna as Parvathi
Vara Lakshmi as Padma

Soundtrack

Music composed by Chakravarthy. Lyrics written by Veturi. Music released on Lahari Music.

References

External links 
 

1987 films
Films scored by K. Chakravarthy
1980s Telugu-language films